There are a number of elementary schools named Longfellow Elementary School:

 Longfellow Elementary School (San Francisco, California)
 Longfellow Elementary School (Whittier, California)
 Longfellow Elementary School (Idaho Falls, Idaho)
 Longfellow Elementary School (Oak Park, Illinois)
 Longfellow Elementary School (Iowa City, Iowa)
 Longfellow Elementary School (Portland, Maine)
 Longfellow Elementary School (Flint, Michigan)
 Longfellow Elementary School (Holland, Michigan)
 Longfellow Elementary School (Fargo, North Dakota)
 Longfellow Elementary School (Minot, North Dakota)
 Longfellow Elementary School (Toledo, Ohio) 
 Longfellow Elementary School (Houston, Texas)
 Longfellow Elementary School (West Allis, Wisconsin)